Paychex, Inc. is an American provider of human resource, payroll, and benefits outsourcing services  for small- to medium-sized businesses. With headquarters in Rochester, New York, the company has more than 100 offices serving approximately 670,000 payroll clients in the U.S. and Europe.
In 2019, Paychex ranked in position 700 on the Fortune 500 list of largest corporations by revenue, and the company's revenue for fiscal year 2020 is projected to exceed $4.1 billion.

History
Paychex was founded in 1971 by Tom Golisano, who started the company with only $3,000.

The operation grew to include 18 franchises and partnerships, which were eventually consolidated into one private company in 1979. Paychex held an initial public offering in 1983 and began trading on the NASDAQ (PAYX).
In the first quarter of fiscal year 2020, the company repurchased $171.9 million of its own stock
and currently has a market capitalization of $30.155 billion.

Acquisitions

Recent acquisitions
In December 2018, Paychex closed on its acquisition of Oasis Outsourcing Acquisition Corporation for $1.2 billion. At the time of the Oasis acquisition, Paychex had 650,000 payroll clients and 14,500 employees. Oasis, a professional employer organization (PEO) brought 8,400 PEO clients, 1,100 employees, and an annual revenue that exceeded $9 billion in 2017. Following the acquisition of Oasis, Paychex provides HR outsourcing services to 1.4 million worksite employees.

Small Business Employment Watch
Paychex and IHS Markit launched a Small Business Jobs Index in 2014 that measures the  health of businesses employing 50 people or less.
Today, the Paychex | IHS Markit Small Business Employment Watch shares small business jobs data going back to 2005 and wage data from 2011 to present.
The Employment Watch is frequently used by financial experts, analysts, and journalists assessing the economic outlook.
Paychex CEO Martin Mucci regularly appears in the media to provide analysis of Small Business Employment Watch data, as well as insight into what the health of Paychex as a company says about the health of small business and the economy in general.

Awards and honors
Paychex named to HR Examiner's 2020 Watchlist for the use of AI in HR
In 2019, Paychex was named to the FORTUNE list of Future 50 companies
Paychex was listed as number 211 on Forbes 2019 list of the World's Best
In 2018, Paychex was named one of the World's Most Ethical Companies by Ethisphere for an 11th time
In 2018, Forbes placed Paychex at number 76 on their list of the World's Most Innovative Companies
Rochester Democrat and Chronicle named Paychex one of the Best Places to Work in Rochester in 2016
Paychex Flex received the 2016 TekTonic Award from HRO Magazine for being a best-in-class mobile and cloud-based technology suite

References

External links

 Wolfram Alpha Fundamentals & Financials

Financial services companies established in 1971
Companies listed on the Nasdaq
Companies based in Monroe County, New York
Business services companies established in 1971
Business services companies of the United States